Trnovo is a municipality located about 30 kilometers southeast of the city of Sarajevo, in Bosnia and Herzegovina.  As a result of the 1995 Dayton Accords, the municipality was divided between the Federation of Bosnia and Herzegovina (FBiH) and Republika Srpska (RS) into the following two municipalities:

 Trnovo, Republika Srpska
 Trnovo, Federation of Bosnia and Herzegovina

Villages
• Balbašići
• Bašci
• Bistročaj
• Bobovica
• Bogatići
• Boljanovići
• Brda
• Brutusi
• Čeružići
• Češina Strana
• Čunčići
• Dejčići
• Delijaš
· Deseci
• Divčići
• Donja Presjenica
• Dujmovići
• Durakovići
• Godinja
• Gornja Presjenica
• Govedovići
• Grab
• Gračanica
• Hamzići
• Ilovice
• Jablanica
• Jelačići
• Karovići
• Kijevo
• Klanac
• Kozija Luka
• Kramari
• Krsmanići
• Ledići
• Lisovići
• Lukavac
• Mađari
• Mijanovići
• Milje
• Obla Brda
• Ostojići
• Pendičići
• Podivič
• Pomenovići
• Prečani
• Rajski Do
• Rakitnica
• Rijeka
• Sjeverovići
• Slavljevići
• Šabanci
• Šabići
• Šišići
• Tošići
• Trebečaj
• Trnovo
• Turovi
• Tušila
• Ulobići
• Umčani
• Umoljani
• Vrbovnik
• Zabojska
• Zagor

Demographic history

1971
9,555 total
 Muslims - 6,342 (66.37%)
 Serbs - 3,093 (32.37%)
 Croats - 50 (0.52%)
 Yugoslavs - 12 (0.12%)
 Others - 58 (0.62%)

1991
6,991
 Muslims - 4,790 (68.81%)
 Serbs - 2,059 (29.45%)
 Croats - 16 (0.22%)
 Yugoslavs - 72 (1.02%)
 Others - 54 (0.80%)

Populated places in Bosnia and Herzegovina
Divided regions